Koosalaane is a village in Peipsiääre Parish, Tartu County in Estonia.

References

Villages in Tartu County